Adriaan Donker (5 December 1933 – 17 July 2002) was a pioneering South African publisher.

Biography
Born in Bilthoven, the Netherlands, he learned book publishing from his father (Ad. Donker, Rotterdam) and Collier Macmillan in London and New York City. He emigrated as sales representative to South Africa in 1966.

Under Apartheid many of Donker’s publications were considered "subversive". Despite pressure from government officials, surveillance by the security police, including threats of loss of passport and illegal house searches, Donker adamantly continued publishing social critical works.

He was founder and director of the Centre of Creative Arts in Durban, initiating the international Poetry Festival and The Time of the Writer.

He was awarded an honorary doctorate for his contribution to South African literature.

Publications
The first publications of black literature in South Africa were under Ad. Donker Publisher in 1974, with Mongane Wally Serote and Sipho Sepamla. Playwright and author Athol Fugard (Tsotsi) and imprisoned poet Dikobe wa Magole (Baptism of Fire) are among the many authors Donker promoted. 
With his love for Literature he republished forgotten works by Bessie Head (Tales of Tenderness and Power), Olive Schreiner’s The Story of an African Farm, Sol T. Plaatje's Mhudi and the then banned work by Bloke Modisane Blame Me On History.

Poetry
Hurry up to it! – Sydney Sipho Sepamla, 1975
The Blues in You and Me – Sipho Sepamla, 1976
Children of the Earth – Sipho Sepamla, 1983
Behold Mama Flowers – Mongane Wally Serote, 1978
Tsetlo – Mongane Wally Serote, 1974 
Yakhal'inkomo – Mongane Wally Serote, 1972
It's Time to Go Home – Christoher van Wyk, 1979
Prison Poems – Dikobe Wa Mogale, 1992
Jol'iinkomo – Mafika Pascal Gwala, 1977

Plays
Marigolds in August – Athol Fugard and Ross Devenish, 1982

Novels
Exiles: A Novel – Rose Zwi, 1984.
This Time of Year and Other Stories – Sheila Roberts, 1983.

References

1933 births
2002 deaths
South African book publishers (people)
People from De Bilt